The 1956 Pro Bowl was the National Football League's sixth annual all-star game which featured top performers from the 1955 season. The game was played on January 15, 1956, at the Los Angeles Memorial Coliseum in Los Angeles, California in front of 37,867 fans. The East squad defeated the West by a score of 31–30.

The West team was led by the Los Angeles Rams Sid Gillman while Joe Kuharich of the Washington Redskins' coached the East squad. Chicago Cardinals back Ollie Matson was selected as the game's outstanding player.

References

External links

Pro Bowl
Pro Bowl
Pro Bowl
Pro Bowl
1956 in Los Angeles
National Football League in Los Angeles
January 1956 sports events in the United States